Veena is a Pakistani television series starring Fahad Mustafa in the titular role as a eunuch, who struggles for the survival of his community. The supporting cast includes Abid Ali, Beenish Chohan, Javeria Abbasi, Shabbir Jan and Nauman Masood. It was directed by Syed Atif Hussain and first broadcast on ARY Digital in 2009.

Mustafa's performance in the series was met with critical acclaim, and is marked as his first breakthrough. The series received two nominations at 9th Lux Style Awards, including Best TV Actor for Mustafa and Best TV Writer.

Plot summary 

The plot focuses on society's attitude towards the queer people and revolves around the struggle journey of Veena, a eunuch who wants to get due rights of his community as a human.

Cast 

 Fahad Mustafa as Veena
 Abid Ali as Munna
 Beenish Chohan as Fazi
 Javeria Abbasi as Shazi
 Hina Dilpazir as Shamsa
 Shagufta Ejaz as Sajida
 Hassan Ahmed as Wahaj
 Danish Taimoor as Najam
 Tehreem Zuberi as Erum
 Badar Khalil as Mehar Sadaf
 Nauman Masood as Qasim
 Mehmood Aslam as Guru
 Shabbir Jan
 Nadia Hussain
 Zara Farooq

Accolades

References 

Pakistani LGBT-related television shows
2009 Pakistani television series debuts
2000s LGBT-related television series